Gangolihat is a Himalayan hill station in the Pithoragarh district of Uttarakhand, India. It is said that here Adi Shankaracharya did penance to please Adi Shakti.   Gangolihat is known for its Shakti Peeth of Haat Kalika Temple - Adi Shakti  and Destroyer of Demon's.

Geography
It has an average elevation of 1,760 metres (5,773 feet). It is 78 km from Pithoragarh. The main town is at a hill top. The region is surrounded by two rivers Saryu and Ramganga. Which meet at Ghat at the foothill of the region. These two rivers make it like a Garland on the shoulders of  mighty Himalaya. These two rivers gave the name to the region Gang (River in Kumaoni) + Awali (Garland) making Gangawali which became Gangoli later on. and Hat were the main markets/ gathering place for local people in past. Which made the name of Gangolihat.

Gangolihat is native of Mehta, Pant, Karki, Kothari, Bhatt's(at Futsil&balatari), Joshi's, Khati, Gusain, Upreti's, Pathak's, Pargai and Mahara. Negi's, Bisht, Rawal's, Verma's, Shah, Bora, Dasoni and Aryas are other major surnames found.

Places of interest

Gangolihat is the site of a number of ancient temples and caves, including the templates of 'Haat Kalika'in the east, 'Ambika Dewaal'in North, 'Chamunda Mandir to the west' and 'Vaishnavi Mandir'. From 'Vaishnavi Mandir' it is possible to clearly view the Himalayas. This temple is situated on a mountain that was called 'Shail Parvat', which is written in Hindu holy books.

The caves in Gangolihaat include 'Patal Bhuvneshwar' (पाताल भुवनेश्वर), 'Shailashwer Gufa' and 'Mukteshwar Gufa'. A cave has also been recently found and that is called 'Bholeshwar Gufa'. The peak Bhurgottam near village Mallagrkha is famous as place of  Bhrigu who was one of the seven great sages, The Saptarshis.. Patal Bhuvneshwar cave is believed to be the abode of 33 crore Gods and Goddesses. 

'Haat Kalika Mandir' was built by Adi Guru Sankaracharya for installation of one of the Shakti Peethas.  It is believed that the goddess Kalika Mata, who is thought to reside in West Bengal, moved from West Bengal to North (Gangolihat). Posthumous Param Veer Chakra award winner Captain Bikram Batra was a great devotee of the goddess. The goddess Mahakali is the designated goddess of the Kumauon Regiment. The Kumaon regiment has created an Army Rest House near the Temple for Army Personnel, who come Gangolihat to get the blessing of Goddess. Several dharamshalas and gates have been built by kumaun regiment.

There are historical monuments made during 8-11th century near the temple. Which is a site preserved by Archaeological Survey of India (ASI). It depicts the nervelessness of the artistic creation at that time. And there is a source of water called janhvi nohla, its water comes from an oak tree. Its water believed so much pure.

The highest peak in the range, Lamkeshwar which is a temple of Lord Shiva, The view of greenery rich valleys of Kumaun Himalayas from this hilltop is memorable and heavenly. It has always been a great trekking site.

References

External links

Tourism in Uttarakhand
Hill stations in Uttarakhand
Cities and towns in Pithoragarh district